CFGS-DT, virtual and UHF digital channel 34, branded on-air as Noovo Gatineau–Ottawa, is a Noovo-affiliated television station licensed to Gatineau, Quebec, Canada, which also serves Franco-Ontarians in the neighbouring capital city of Ottawa, Ontario. The station is owned by RNC Media, as part of a twinstick with TVA affiliate CHOT-DT (channel 40). The two stations share studios on Rue Jean Proulx and Rue Buteau in the former city of Hull; CFGS-DT's transmitter is located at Camp Fortune in Chelsea, Quebec. This station can also be seen on Vidéotron channel 5 and in high definition channel 605 in Gatineau, Rogers Cable on channel 11, channel 605, in high definition on digital channel 606 in Ottawa, and on Shaw Direct, in HD on channel 214 and SD on 725.

CFGS-DT is the largest Noovo station that is not owned-and-operated by the network. It is also the second major network affiliate in Canada in a media market that is not owned by its associated network, after CHOT.

Overview
It was originally broadcast on UHF channel 49 from its debut on September 7, 1986, until moving to its current over-the-air channel position in 2001. However, prior to changing its listings to national listings only, TV Guide always had this station listed as Channel 49.

CFGS's operation is considerably smaller than sister station CHOT — the station only airs a 10-minute local newscast weekdays at 5:30 p.m. anchored by Louka Jacques, along with brief news updates in the morning and in the evening. There are only two anchors (one for the morning news update and one for the 5:30 p.m. news). For a brief period in 2006, there was an occasional commentary by former MP Françoise Boivin on stories that made headlines.

Digital television and high definition
The analog television shutdown and digital conversion, took place on August 31, 2011, however, CFGS-TV was granted a temporary extension for their analogue broadcasts. CFGS-DT began its digital broadcasts on its current assigned analogue channel, UHF 34 on October 31, 2011.

References

External links
Noovo Gatineau–Ottawa 

FGS
FGS
Television channels and stations established in 1986
FGS
1986 establishments in Quebec